Animated Crocodile, abbreviated as MuK, was a Soviet satirical animated series for adults. It was produced by Soyuzmultfilm and directed by various people. Between 1960 and 1961 6 issues have been released (3 per year). Each episode consisted of several short unrelated stories, except the 4th episode Out into the Open which had a single plot devoted to the topic of water pollution. Multiplikatsionniy Krokodil was popular with the audience.

The protagonist of series was the Red Crocodile, the mascot of a Soviet satirical magazine Krokodil. He was voiced by Ivan Lyubeznov in the first episodes and then by Lev Lyubetsky. The voice cast also included Georgy Vitsin, Sergey Martinson, Anatoli Papanov, Lev Potyomkin and others, as well as starting Soviet leader Nikita Khrushchev.

See also 
 Fitil

References 

Russian political satire

External links
 Multiplikatsionniy Krokodil at www.animator.ru
https://www.kinopoisk.ru/film/1044425/cast/

1960 in animation
1960s Soviet television series
Soviet animated television series
Animated satirical television series
Soyuzmultfilm